In engineering, science, and statistics, replication is the repetition of an experimental condition so that the variability associated with the phenomenon can be estimated. ASTM, in standard E1847, defines replication as "... the repetition of the set of all the treatment combinations to be compared in an experiment. Each of the repetitions is called a replicate."

Replication is not the same as repeated measurements of the same item: they are dealt with differently in statistical experimental design and data analysis.

For proper sampling, a process or batch of products should be in reasonable statistical control; inherent random variation is present but variation due to assignable (special) causes is not. Evaluation or testing of a single item does not allow for item-to-item variation and may not represent the batch or process.  Replication is needed to account for this variation among items and treatments.

Example
As an example, consider a continuous process which produces items. Batches of items are then processed or treated. Finally, tests or measurements are conducted.  Several options might be available to obtain ten test values. Some possibilities are:
 One finished and treated item might be measured repeatedly to obtain ten test results.  Only one item was measured so there is no replication.  The repeated measurements help identify observational error.
 Ten finished and treated items might be taken from a batch and each measured once.  This is not full replication because the ten samples are not random and not representative of the continuous nor batch processing.
 Five items are taken from the continuous process based on sound statistical sampling.  These are processed in a batch and tested twice each.  This includes replication of initial samples but does not allow for batch-to-batch variation in processing.  The repeated tests on each provide some measure and control of testing error.
 Five items are taken from the continuous process based on sound statistical sampling.  These are processed in five different batches and tested twice each.  This plan includes proper replication of initial samples and also includes batch-to-batch variation.  The repeated tests on each provide some measure and control of testing error.

Each option would call for different data analysis methods and yield different conclusions.

See also

 Degrees of freedom (statistics)
 Design of experiments
 Pseudoreplication
 Sample size
 Statistical ensemble
 Statistical process control
 Test method

Bibliography
 ASTM E122-07 Standard Practice for Calculating Sample Size to Estimate, With Specified Precision, the Average for a Characteristic of a Lot or Process
 "Engineering Statistics Handbook", NIST/SEMATEK
 Pyzdek, T, "Quality Engineering Handbook", 2003, .
 Godfrey, A. B., "Juran's Quality Handbook", 1999, .

Design of experiments
Sampling (statistics)